Paleoplatyura is a genus of predatory fungus gnats in the family Keroplatidae. There are about seven described species in Paleoplatyura. Fossil species are known from the mid-Cretaceous Burmese amber of Myanmar, dating to around 100 million years ago.

Species
These seven species belong to the genus Paleoplatyura:
P. aldrichii Johannsen, 1909
P. johnsoni Johannsen, 1910
P. melanderi Fisher, 1941
† M. macrocera (Meunier, 1899)
† P. eocenica Cockerell, 1921
† P. loewi Meunier, 1922
† P. macrocera Meunier, 1899

References

Keroplatidae
Articles created by Qbugbot
Sciaroidea genera